Pelagio is an opera (tragedia lirica) in four acts by Saverio Mercadante. The Italian-language libretto was by Marco D'Arienzo. It premiered on 12 February 1857 at the Teatro San Carlo, Naples, to great success.

The opera had further successful performances in Milan and Lisbon.

In modern times, Pelagio was performed in 2005 in Gijón, Spain, and in 2008 at the Festival della Valle d'Itria.

Pelagio is an opera with "roots in the bel canto tradition that shows the influence of Verdi", and the work has been described as rich in "excellent music", with "at least one aria (for Bianca in act 4) of an almost Verdian intensity and pathos".

Roles

Synopsis
Place: Gijón and Asturias
Time: 8th century

The main character is the Asturian king who founded the Kingdom of Asturias and fought against the Moors. It is supposed that his daughter Bianca, brought up by Giralda because Pelagio was believed to be dead, falls in love with the Moor Abdel-Aor, governor of the city of Gijón. Bianca is thus cursed by Pelagius. The opera ends with the death of Bianca, killed by the same Abdel-Aor because he realizes that the love with Bianca has become impossible and is convinced that Bianca is betraying him to help her father.

Recordings

References
Notes

Sources
Rose, Michael (1998), "Mercandante, (Giuseppe) Saverio (Raffaele)" in Stanley Sadie, (ed.), The New Grove Dictionary of Opera, Vol. Three, pp. 334–339. London: Macmillan Publishers, Inc.

External links

Première libretto, from the Bayerische Staatsbibliothek

Operas
Italian-language operas
1857 operas
Operas by Saverio Mercadante
Operas set in Spain
Pelagius of Asturias